"Pow R. Toc H." is an instrumental, with vocal effects, by Pink Floyd on their 1967 album The Piper at the Gates of Dawn. In addition to the vocal effects, the piano is a prominent instrument in the piece.

Background
Toc H. was the army signallers' code for "TH", representing Talbot House, a club where officers and enlisted men were equals, which later became an interdenominational Christian fellowship organization serving the community. (The emblem of Toc H. is an oil lamp, so a "power Toc H." would be an electric torch—probably with a dim bulb, as per the saying "as dim as a Toc H. lamp".)

According to Nick Mason, the original four members of Pink Floyd (Syd Barrett, Roger Waters, Richard Wright and Mason) were present at Abbey Road Studios and watched the Beatles record "Lovely Rita" from Sgt. Pepper's Lonely Hearts Club Band. Voice effects and noises similar to those used in "Lovely Rita" could be heard in "Pow R. Toc H.", recorded in the next studio during the same period.

Waters also uses the "scream" he later used in "Careful with That Axe, Eugene".

Alternative and live versions
"Pow R. Toc H." was renamed "The Pink Jungle" in the "Journey" part of The Man and The Journey. Pink Floyd performed the song live from 1967 to 1969.

Personnel
 Syd Barrett – acoustic guitar, electric guitars, vocal percussion
 Roger Waters – bass guitar, screams
 Richard Wright – Farfisa organ, piano, additional vocalisations
 Nick Mason – drums, percussion

References

Pink Floyd songs
1967 songs
Songs written by Syd Barrett
Songs written by Nick Mason
Songs written by Richard Wright (musician)
Songs written by Roger Waters
1960s instrumentals